Saint Eanswith (born c. 630, Kent, England. Died c. 650, Folkestone, England), also spelled Eanswythe or Eanswide, was an Anglo-Saxon princess, who is said to have founded Folkestone Priory, one of the first Christian monastic communities for women in Britain. Her possible remains were the subject of research, published in 2020.

Life
Eanswith was a princess of the Kingdom of Kent. Her father was Eadbald, who ruled as king of Kent from 616 to 640 CE. Her mother, Eadbald's second wife, was Emma, who may have been a Frankish princess; she also bore him two sons, Eormenred and Eorcenberht. Eanswith's grandfather, Æthelberht of Kent had been the first king of Anglo-Saxon England to accept Christian baptism.

Tradition has it that Eanswith founded the Benedictine Folkestone Priory, the first nunnery in England. She was supported in this by her father, Eadbald. 

While the monastery was under construction, a pagan prince came to Kent seeking to marry Eanswith. King Eadbald, whose sister Æthelburh (Ethelburga) had married the pagan King Edwin two or three years before, recalled that this wedding resulted in Edwin's conversion. Eanswith, however, refused.

This was the first women's monastery to be founded in England. Eanswith lived there with her companions in the monastic life, and they may have been guided by some of the monks who had come to England with Augustine in the Gregorian mission of 597.

Veneration

She remained at the abbey until her death.

The first monastic site became abandoned by the 10th century, and began to be eroded by the sea, a problem which also afflicted a new foundation of 1095. A site further inland was provided for a new foundation of Folkestone Priory by William de Abrincis in 1137, with a church dedicated to St Mary and to Eanswith. Saint Eanswith's day falls on 12 September;  traditionally, this is the date on which her remains were translated to the new church in 1138. The priory was closed at the Reformation, and the priory church became the parish church of Folkestone, St Mary and St Eanswythe's Church. During restoration work at the church in 1885, human remains were discovered in a lead reliquary, embedded within the church's north wall, which were identified as a 12th-century vessel, and the bones of a young woman. This led to the supposition that they could be the translated relics of Saint Eanswith, hidden at the Reformation.

Iconography
Eanswith is sometimes portrayed with a fish, along with her abbess's staff, crown and a book. This appears to be a recent attribute, from Folkestone's fishing port connection.

Documentary sources
 Eanswith is named in the genealogies of some versions of the Kentish Royal Legend
 Goscelin of Saint-Bertin mentions Eanswith in his 11th-century Vita Sancta Werburge.
 John of Tynemouth (14th-century chronicler) has a substantive account in his Sanctilogium. As with all the Kentish Abbesses, Bede does not name Eanswith, so John must have had another source.

New research

In 2017 a collaboration began between Kent historians and archaeologists from Canterbury Christ Church University and Folkestone Museum. Church legislation was required for the removal and examination of the human remains that had been uncovered in 1885. In 2020, osteoarchaeologists were given the opportunity to examine the remains. Osteologists tested teeth and bones and determined that they had come from one person, probably a woman, aged between 17 and 21, with no signs of malnutrition, all consistent with the history of Eanswith. Samples were sent to scientists at Queen's University Belfast and radiocarbon dating confirmed that the remains were from the mid-7th century. The 'Finding Eanswythe' project received a grant from the Heritage Lottery Fund.

It can never be proven that the remains are St Eanswith but, if they were, they would be the earliest remains yet discovered of an English saint, and of a relative of the British monarch.

Church dedications

As well as the former priory church at Folkestone, Eanswith has the following church dedications:-
 St Eanswith's Church, Brenzett, Kent, England
 St Eanswythe's Church, Altona, Victoria, Australia

See also
Christianisation of Anglo-Saxon England

Notes

References

External links
 
 Finding Eanswythe Project

614 births
640 deaths
Kentish saints
House of Kent